Mystics in Bali (originally released as Leák) is a 1981 Indonesian supernatural horror film directed by H. Tjut Djalil. Based on the novel Leák Ngakak by Putra Mada, the film stars Ilona Agathe Bastian, Yos Santo, Sofia W.D., and W.D. Mochtar.

The film focuses on black magic and borrows from Southeast Asian folklore and Balinese mythology, specifically the Leyak and the Penanggalan, spirits that appear in the form of a flying head with organs and entrails still attached. The film has been called a cult classic of Indonesian horror cinema.

Plot
Catherine "Cathy" Kean is an American (or, depending on the dub, Australian) woman who travels to Bali to write a book about voodoo and black magic. She learns of Leák magic from her lover Mahendra, who says that it is the most powerful form of black magic and that it can be used to kill. After attending a ceremonial ritual, Mahendra agrees to help Cathy study magic, and they share a kiss as an unknown woman watches from afar. The next night, after a brief thunderstorm, the two meet the cackling leader of the Leák cult, an old witch with long fingernails known as the Queen of the Leák.

The Queen of the Leák shows the two her face, but says that her face changes every time she makes an appearance. Before departing, the Queen shakes hands with Cathy, and her severed arm is left in Cathy's grip. She drops it in fright, and the arm crawls a short distance and stops. The following night, Cathy and Mahendra bring bottles of blood to quench the Queen's thirst. The Queen, revealing herself only as a prehensile tongue, orders Cathy to take off her skirt, and carves a spell into Cathy's upper thigh. The Queen demands that Cathy return the next night, and that Mahendra is not to join her.

The next day, Cathy asks Mahendra to read the spell on her thigh, but he can only decipher the word "Leák". At midnight, wearing a tapis, Cathy ventures into the graveyard. The Queen appears, cackling, and Cathy laughs maniacally and dances with her, and they transform into pigs. Later, Mahendra's uncle, Machesse, teaches him mantras which can counteract Leák magic. Cathy tells Mahendra that she and the Queen could communicate telepathically, and that she envisioned destroying a wall of fire, which Mahendra says means that she killed someone somewhere. Cathy feels ill, but tells Mahendra that the Queen will cure her illness that night. In her meeting with the Queen that night, Cathy's head, organs, and entrails detach from her body. Now a floating vampiric head under the control of the Queen, Cathy's head flies into the home of a pregnant woman and sucks out the unborn baby from the mother's womb.

Cathy's head returns to her body, her illness is cured, and the blood she devoured invigorates the Queen's youthfulness and power. They transform into snakes, and Cathy awakens as a human and vomits mice. During the night, in the form of fireballs, the Queen and Cathy defeat one of the Queen's enemies. The unknown woman witnesses Cathy's head flying, and she tells Machesse, who informs his colleagues of the evil and retreats to meditate. The Queen appears to Cathy as a young woman and detaches her head again. Machesse finds Cathy's headless body, and the townspeople attempt to ward off the flying head. Machesse tells Mahendra that Cathy is no longer the woman he loves, and they bury her body to prevent the head from reattaching. Mahendra dreams of Cathy, who pleads for her body to be exhumed.

That night, the Queen and the flying head appear to Machesse and Mahendra in the graveyard. The Queen, revealed to be an old rival of Machesse, uses her powers to disinter Cathy's body. The head reattaches, and the Queen electrocutes Machesse and slices his neck, killing him. The unknown woman, revealed to be Mahendra's former lover, tries to attack the Queen but is killed. Mahendra's uncle Oka appears and attacks the Queen. The Queen transforms into a humanoid pig, which Oka stabs in the heart with a dagger. Becoming a masked figure, the Queen shoots energy at Oka, who projects energy in return, causing an explosion. The Queen and Cathy are killed by the sunrise.

Cast
 Ilona Agathe Bastian as Catherine "Cathy" Kean
 Yos Santo as Mahendra
 Sofia W.D. as the Old Queen of the Leák
 Debby Cynthia Dewi as the Young Queen of the Leák
 W.D. Mochtar as Machesse / Oka

Production
In the late 1970s and early 1980s, the Indonesian government saw films as a possible source for foreign revenue. As a result, low-budget Indonesian exploitation films were produced and exported to international markets. The most successful films in overseas markets were generally produced by any one of three studios—Rapi Films, Parkit, or Soraya Intercine Films. Mystics in Bali was directed by H. Tjut Djalil, who would go on to direct the 1989 film Lady Terminator.

The film draws from elements of Southeast Asian folklore and Balinese mythology, incorporating the mythological Leyak, which takes the form of a flying, disembodied head with entrails and internal organs still connected and hanging down from the neck. There are variations of this legend among different cultures, with it being known as a Penanggalan in the Malay Peninsula and a Krasue in various countries in Mainland Southeast Asia, such as Thailand, Cambodia and Laos.

The film's lead, Ilona Agathe Bastian, was not an actress prior to the film's production. Rather, she was a German tourist visiting Bali who was chosen by the wife of one of the film's producers to portray the female protagonist. Filming took place on the Indonesian island of Java rather than on location in Bali, as Hindu locals were too superstitious to allow the black magic rituals shown in the film to be performed there.

Release
The film was not widely released on VHS, being distributed only to Indonesian and Japanese markets, yet it has achieved a minor cult status among horror fans. The film was released on DVD in 2003 by the label Mondo Macabro, though this version has since gone out of print. In October 2007, Mondo Macabro re-released the film with a new high-definition transfer from the film's original negative.

In 2016, the Alamo Drafthouse Cinema in South Lamar, Austin, Texas offered a free double feature screening of Day of Wrath (1943) and Mystics in Bali, in preparation for the release of The VVitch.

Critical reception
Stuart Galbraith IV of DVD Talk called the film "a landmark of Indonesian horror", but noted that the film "isn't as daffily entertaining as Mondo's other Indonesian titles, notably Lady Terminator and Virgins from Hell, though it has its moments". Madelyn Sutton of Silver Screen Riot called the film "a raw horror romp that embraces its supposed unbelievability to playful, gory effect". In their Best of the Worst webseries, Jay Bauman, Jack Packard, Mike Stoklasa, and Rich Evans of RedLetterMedia all selected Mystics in Bali as being superior to the films Kiss Meets the Phantom of the Park and Killer Workout, with Bauman stating that "it's not a great movie, but it's incredibly entertaining".

See also
 Balinese topeng dance – a form of Indonesian dance involving the use of masks
 Krasue – a spirit in Southeast Asian folklore manifesting as a disembodied head with entrails attached
 Inhuman Kiss – a 2019 Thai romantic horror film about a krasue
 Manananggal – a vampire-like creature in Filipino folklore
 Mythology of Indonesia – the collected myths and legends of Indonesia
 Penanggalan – an entity in Malay ghost myths manifesting as a head with entrails attached

References

External links
 
 [https://www.rottentomatoes.com/m/mystics_in_bali/ Mystics of Bali] on Rotten Tomatoes

1981 films
1980s Indonesian-language films
1981 horror films
Folk horror films
Films shot in Indonesia
1980s supernatural horror films
Films about witchcraft
Indonesian supernatural horror films
Films about snakes
Films about pigs
Films set in Bali
Vampires in film
Films about shapeshifting
1980s exploitation films